Flesh and Spirit is a 1922 American silent drama film directed by Joseph Levering and starring Belle Bennett, Walter Ringham and Denton Vane.

Cast
 Belle Bennett as Truth Eldridge
 Walter Ringham as Donald Wallace
 Denton Vane as James Dale
 James McDuff as Reverend Howard Renfield
 Rita Rogan as Peggy
 Logan Paul as Peters Roberts
 Jean Robertson as Paula Roberts
 May Kitson as Mrs. Wallace
 Hayden Stevenson as The Gardener
 Mary Rehan as His wife

References

Bibliography
 John T. Soister, Henry Nicolella & Steve Joyce. American Silent Horror, Science Fiction and Fantasy Feature Films, 1913-1929. McFarland, 2014.

External links
 

1922 films
1922 drama films
1920s English-language films
American silent feature films
Silent American drama films
American black-and-white films
Films directed by Joseph Levering
1920s American films